Major (or possibly Colonel) Abdoulaye Adamou Harouna (whose name is also reported as Harouna Adamou) is a Nigerian military figure who led the military coup which overthrew President Mamadou Tandja on February 18, 2010.

Harouna led the coup action, in which soldiers drove into Niamey, opened fire on the presidential palace, and captured President Tandja. After the success of the coup, Chef d'escadron Salou Djibo became Niger's de facto leader as head of the Supreme Council for the Restoration of Democracy.

See also
Supreme Council for the Restoration of Democracy
2010 Niger coup d'état

References

Living people
Nigerien military personnel
Year of birth missing (living people)